Franco Assetto (born 1911 in Turin – d. 1991 in Turin) was an Italian sculptor and painter who lived in the United States for much of his life.

Franco Assetto's works are owned by the MoMa in New York.  On the occasion of his exhibition "The Bread Show" at the Galleria della Bussola in Turin (1952), he presented a number of bread loaves cast in bronze, eight years before Jasper Johns thought of casting beer cans.

He was part of a group of artists, together with Lucio Fontana, Giuseppe Capogrossi, Alberto Burri and a few others, who wanted to redefine the parameters of post-war art and saw the Informel as the essential condition for the artistic quest in which Form are given as the primary possibility to build the artists own existential experience.

When experiments with informalism reached saturation point he devoted himself to Baroque Autre.

He later became interested in the artistic potential of water and designed a number of public fountains. One of his fountains is positioned in front of the museum of Frontino, Italy.

In 1987, he created a statue placed in Raoul Wallenberg Square at Beverly Boulevard in Los Angeles. The work of art named "Angel of Rescue" is an 18-foot sculpture of Raoul Wallenberg, a Swedish hero of the Holocaust. It depicts a bronze silhouette of Wallenberg flanked by two polished stainless steel "wings." Assetto donated his services and the Jewish Community Foundation/Raoul Wallenberg Memorial Fund provided the funds to build it. Other public art projects include the Via Crucis in St. Basil Catholic Church, Los Angeles, and The Big Candy in MacArthur Park, Los Angeles.

For some 20 years he had been married to the prominent U.S. West Coast music patron Betty Freeman, the subject of David Hockney's painting Beverly Hills Housewife. The couple began hosting musicales in their art-filled Beverly Hills home.  According to critic Alan Rich the salons became "the Los Angeles Sunday afternoon hot ticket", featuring such big names such as Philip Glass, Elliott Carter, John Cage and Pierre Boulez, as well as younger artists just beginning their careers. The programs always ended with a pasta feast cooked by Assetto. Freeman ended the programs after he died in 1991. In 1978 composer Lou Harrison once wrote a tribute for the two called "Serenade for Betty Freeman and Franco Assetto".

When he died Assetto left two children Vincenzo, Vittoria and three grandchildren Marco Assetto, Viviana Assetto and Sabrina Ferrara.

1911 births
1991 deaths
Artists from Turin
20th-century Italian painters
Italian male painters
20th-century Italian sculptors
20th-century Italian male artists
Italian male sculptors
Italian contemporary artists
Italian emigrants to the United States